Ward Lynn Armstrong (born June 2, 1956 in Bassett, Virginia) is an American trial lawyer and Democratic politician. He served in the Virginia House of Delegates from 1992 to 2011, and served as the minority leader from 2007 to 2011.

Electoral history

Early life
Armstrong was raised in Bassett, Virginia, graduating from John D. Bassett High School in 1974.  He then attended  Duke University, where he earned a business degree in 1977.  In 1980, Armstrong received a JD degree from the University of Richmond School of Law.
During law school, he studied for a summer at the University of Cambridge in England. After law school, he worked as a law clerk to Justice W. Carrington Thompson of the Supreme Court of Virginia for one year. He has practiced law in Martinsville, Virginia since 1981.

House of Delegates
He represented the 10th House District, and served on the Courts of Justice, Rules, and Finance committees. On February 24, 2007, Armstrong was elected Minority Leader of the Democrats in the Virginia House of Delegates. As Minority Leader, he has organized the "51 Club" to assist candidates in an effort to establish a Democratic majority in the House of Delegates.

As of early 2008, Armstrong said he would oppose closing an exemption for one-on-one gun sales between individuals from instant background checks (the gun show loophole), even though he usually plays a key role in rallying Democratic support for Governor Tim Kaine's agenda, saying "My constituents pretty much expect me to oppose it," he said. "Carroll County is my district, and it¹s home to one of the largest gun shows on the East Coast." Armstrong, with two young daughters of his own, said he is filled with sympathy for the Virginia Tech Massacre victims but that it won't sway his opposition to closing the loophole. "As legislators, we have to be dispassionate when it comes to the law."

The Virginia Fifth Congressional District Democratic Committee awarded Armstrong the A. L. Philpott Award for Leadership. He is past president of the Martinsville-Henry County Bar Association; a member of the Virginia Museum of Transportation's Board of Directors; and a member of the Norfolk and Western Historical Society.

Armstrong was defeated on November 8, 2011 while running for election in the 9th House District.  Armstrong was placed in the 16th District during the required redistricting after the 2010 census. The 16th district seat was held by Republican incumbent Donald Merricks. Armstrong chose to relocate and challenge Republican incumbent Charles Poindexter in the 9th House district. He left his home and moved into his mother-in-law's house in the town of Bassett. Poindexter defeated Armstrong with 53% to 47% of the vote. During his 2011 campaign Armstrong raised and spent more than $1,000,000.

Armstrong considered running for governor, Lieutenant Governor or attorney general in the 2013 elections but decided not to seek a higher office.

Personal life
Armstrong and his wife, Pamela Akers, have two daughters:  Courtney Lynn and Whitney Akers.

References

External links
Ward Armstrong official campaign website
Virginia House of Delegates - Ward L. Armstrong official VA website

 Profile from Virginia Public Access Project
Follow the Money - Ward L. Armstrong
2005 2003 2001 1999 campaign contributions
Washington Post - Ward L. Armstrong local election 2008 profile

1956 births
Living people
Politicians from Roanoke, Virginia
Baptists from Virginia
Democratic Party members of the Virginia House of Delegates
Virginia lawyers
Fuqua School of Business alumni
University of Richmond School of Law alumni
People from Bassett, Virginia
21st-century American politicians
20th-century American politicians